= Pakhwal =

Village in Punjab, Pakistan

Pakhwal is a village located in Gujrat District in Punjab, Pakistan.
